Chocolate chips or chocolate morsels are small chunks of sweetened chocolate, used as an ingredient in a number of desserts (notably chocolate chip cookies and muffins), in trail mix and less commonly in some breakfast foods such as pancakes. They are often manufactured as teardrop-shaped volumes with flat circular bases; another variety of chocolate chips have the shape of rectangular or square blocks.

Origin
Chocolate chips were created with the invention of chocolate chip cookies in 1937 when Ruth Graves Wakefield of the Toll House Inn in the town of Whitman, Massachusetts added cut-up chunks of a semi-sweet Nestlé chocolate bar to a cookie recipe. (The Nestlé brand Toll House cookies is named for the inn.)  The cookies were a huge success, and Wakefield reached an agreement in 1939 with Nestlé to add her recipe to the chocolate bar's packaging in exchange for a lifetime supply of chocolate. Initially, Nestlé included a small chopping tool with the chocolate bars. In 1941, Nestlé and at least one of its competitors started selling the chocolate in "chip" (or "morsel") form.

Types
Originally, chocolate chips were made of semi-sweet chocolate, but today there are many flavors. These include bittersweet, peanut butter, butterscotch, mint chocolate, white chocolate, dark chocolate, milk chocolate, and white and dark swirled chips.

Uses

Chocolate chips can be used in cookies, pancakes, waffles, cakes, pudding, muffins, crêpes, pies, hot chocolate, and various pastries. They are also found in many other retail food products such as granola bars, ice cream, and trail mix.

Baking and melting
Chocolate chips can also be melted and used in sauces and other recipes.

Although convenient, melted chocolate chips are not always recommended as a substitute for baking chocolate. Because most chocolate chips are designed to retain their shape when baking, they contain less cocoa butter than baking chocolate, and so can be more difficult to work with melted.

Availability
Chocolate chips are popular as a baking ingredient in the United States.  Originating in the US, the chocolate chip cookie is widely available many parts of the world. Nestlé and the Hershey Company are some producers of chocolate chips.

References

Chocolate
Food ingredients